In English, the phrase fly in the ointment is an idiomatic expression for a drawback, especially one that was not at first apparent, for example: "We had a cookstove, beans, and plates; the fly in the ointment was the lack of a can opener."

The likely source is a phrase in the  biblical book of Ecclesiastes:
Dead flies cause the ointment of the apothecary to send forth a stinking savour. (Ecclesiastes )

For four centuries, a fly in the ointment has meant a small defect that spoils something valuable or is a source of annoyance. The modern version thus suggests that something unpleasant may come or has come to light in a proposition or condition that is almost too pleasing; that there is something wrong hidden, unexpected somewhere.

Sources
 The Fly in the Ointment: 70 Fascinating Commentaries on the Science of Everyday Life by Joseph A. Schwarcz, Ecw Press, May 28, 2004.
 2107 Curious Word Origins, Sayings & Expressions from White Elephants to a Song and Dance by Charles Earle Funk (Galahad Book, New York, 1993
 Encyclopedia of Word and Phrase Origins by Robert Hendrickson (Facts on File, New York, 1997).

References

English proverbs
Biblical phrases
Ecclesiastes